Jacqueline "Jackie" Siegel (born January 19, 1966) is an American socialite, model, actress, and beauty pageant director. She is one of the main subjects of the 2012 documentary film The Queen of Versailles, directed by Lauren Greenfield, and its sequel series, Queen of Versailles Reigns Again.

Early life 
Siegel, born Jacqueline Mallery to John and Deborah Mallery, was raised in Endwell, New York and graduated from the Rochester Institute of Technology in 1989 with a bachelor's degree in computer engineering.

Career 
In 1993, she won the Mrs. Florida America beauty pageant. She now owns the Mrs. Florida America beauty pageant contest and serves as its director.

Siegel is on the board of directors of Westgate Resorts and Ocoee Thrift Mart, a store selling used goods that she owns and founded and which donates some of its profits to charity. She also founded the charity Locals Helping Locals.

Siegel was featured in an episode of ABC's Celebrity Wife Swap in June 2015.

The television series The Queen of Versailles Reigns Again, which continues the story of the house and Siegel family, started airing on the Discovery+ streaming service in Spring 2022. The series moved to HBO Max in December 2022.

Personal life 
Siegel is the wife of Westgate Resorts owner David Siegel. They married in a Jewish ceremony in 2000. They have eight children together, including her adopted niece, Jonquil, who came to live with them after her mother died, and one daughter from a previous relationship, Victoria. Their other children are: David, Daniel, Debbie, Drew, and twins, Jacqueline and Jordan. Her daughter, Victoria, died of a drug overdose at age 18 in June 2015.

Filmography

References

External links 
 
 Ocoee Thrift Mart
 

Living people
1966 births
American socialites
Rochester Institute of Technology alumni
Actors from Binghamton, New York
People from Windermere, Florida
American beauty pageant winners
Participants in American reality television series
Place of birth missing (living people)
Siegel family
Beauty pageant owners
Mrs. America (contest) delegates